Lakeside Speedway is a 4/10 mile auto racing Dirt track located in Kansas City, Kansas. It features racing on a weekly basis from April to September in USRA Modified, USRA Stock Car, USRA B-Mod, E-Modifieds, Grand National and Factory Stock categories. Racing at the track is sanctioned by United States Racing Association.

History
The track originally opened on April 17, 1955, at 92nd and Leavenworth Road. However, three deaths during the 1956 racing season forced its closure. Lakeside Speedway reopened under new management in 1961 and continued at the Leavenworth Road location through 1988 when developers for The Woodlands dog & horse racing track purchased the property. Lakeside Speedway then moved to its present location at 5615 Wolcott Drive, also in Kansas City, Kansas. The move enabled not only construction of modern grandstands and a press box, but also provided room for an adjacent campground for racing fans. From 1989 to 1999 Lakeside operated as a half-mile asphalt track. In 2000, it was again under new management, which converted the speedway to a high-banked 4/10-mile dirt track. Flooding is an ongoing concern at the facility due to its close proximity to the Missouri River.

NASCAR connection
The track hosted one NASCAR Convertible Series event in 1956. The race was won by Frank Mundy. The NASCAR Midwest Series also ran one race at the speedway in 1999.

Among the notable NASCAR drivers who have raced at Lakeside Speedway is Clint Bowyer. Bowyer still holds several records at the track.

Most wins(2000-2013)

This list includes point races only, no special races.
Drivers in bold currently race at Lakeside Speedway.
The numbers in parenthesis represent how many wins the driver has this season.

Partially Updated September 27, 2014

Sources: Lakesidespeedway.net (JRfan), Speednetdirect.com, & racinboys.com

Track championships

Last updated February 4, 2017

Track champions year by year

Last updated February 4, 2017

References

External links
 Lakeside Speedway
 Lakeside Speedway race results at Racing-Reference
 Facebook page
 C.A.R.B

Buildings and structures in Kansas City, Kansas
Motorsport venues in Kansas
NASCAR tracks
Tourist attractions in Wyandotte County, Kansas